John Greene Jr. (1620 – 27 November 1708) was a deputy governor of the Colony of Rhode Island and Providence Plantations who spent almost his entire adult life in the public service of the colony. Born in England, he was the son of John Greene Sr. and Joan Tattersall, and sailed to New England with his parents in 1635 aboard the ship James. His father, after coming from Massachusetts to Providence, became one of the original settlers of Warwick. In 1652 Greene served in his first public role as a commissioner from Warwick, and served in some public capacity every year until 1690 when he was first chosen as deputy governor of the colony. He then served 10 consecutive one-year terms in this capacity, retiring from public service in 1700 at the age of 80. He was one of the 10 Assistants named in the Royal Charter of 1663, which would become the basis for Rhode Island's government for nearly two centuries. During the devastating events of King Phillips War, Greene was one of 16 prominent inhabitants of the colony whose counsel was sought by the General Assembly.

Greene died in Warwick on 27 November 1708 and was buried on the Spring Greene Farm (later the property of Governor Theodore F. Green) in Warwick. Greene married Ann Almy, the daughter of William and Audry (Barlow) Almy. They had 11 children, the youngest of whom, Samuel, married Mary Gorton, a granddaughter of Rhode Island colonial president Samuel Gorton. Their grandson, William Greene Sr. served for 11 one-year terms as a governor of the colony, and their great-grandson, also named William Greene Jr. was a governor of the State of Rhode Island. John and Ann Greene are also ancestors of United States President Warren G. Harding, as well as inventor Thomas A. Edison, Canadian politician and religious leader Nathan Eldon Tanner, cowboy artist and inventor Earl W. Bascom and Hollywood actor John Wayne.


See also

 William Greene (colonial governor) for ancestral chart
 List of lieutenant governors of Rhode Island
 Colony of Rhode Island and Providence Plantations

Images

References

Bibliography

External links
State list of lieutenant governors of Rhode Island

1620 births
1708 deaths
English emigrants
Politicians from Warwick, Rhode Island
Rhode Island Attorneys General
People of colonial Rhode Island
Greene family of Rhode Island